Hayne is an unincorporated community in Seward County, Kansas, United States.  A post office was opened in Hayne in 1908, and remained in operation until it was discontinued in 1925.

The time zone in Hayne is Central Daylight Time, which is 6 hours behind Coordinated Universal Time (UTC).

References

Further reading

External links
 Seward County maps: Current, Historic, KDOT

Unincorporated communities in Seward County, Kansas
Unincorporated communities in Kansas